122 Leadenhall Street, which is also known as the Leadenhall Building, is a  skyscraper in central London. It opened in July 2014 and was designed by the Rogers Stirk Harbour + Partners; it is known informally as The Cheesegrater because of its distinctive wedge shape similar to that of the kitchen utensil with the same name. It is one of numerous tall buildings recently completed or under construction in the City of London financial district, including 20 Fenchurch Street, 22 Bishopsgate and The Scalpel.

The site is adjacent to the Lloyd's Building, also designed by Rogers, which is the current home of the insurance market Lloyd's of London. Until 2007 the Leadenhall site was occupied by a building owned by British Land and designed by Gollins Melvin Ward Partnership, which was constructed in the 1960s. That building was demolished in preparation for redevelopment of the site. By December 2009 the site was cleared but construction had stalled, initially due to the financial crisis. The project was revived in October 2010 and Oxford Properties co-developed the property in partnership with British Land.

Site history

Prior to the site's previous redevelopment in the 1960s, it had been used as the head office of the Peninsular and Oriental Steam Navigation Company (P&O) for over a century. From 1840, P&O had occupied, rent-free, the offices of Willcox & Anderson. However, business east of the Gulf of Suez increased in the late 1840s, so they needed larger offices. In November 1845, the King's Arms inn and hotel at 122 Leadenhall Street was put up for sale. P&O purchased the freehold for £7,250, and then commissioned an architect, Beachcroft, to design a new building. The cost of the new building was estimated at £8,000. In March 1848, P&O moved into the new office.

In 1854, P&O unsuccessfully attempted to purchase the neighbouring building at 121 Leadenhall Street. They eventually took a lease from the charity which held it. They also bought leases of 80 years from St. Thomas's Hospital on the residential properties at Nos. 123, 124 and 125 Leadenhall Street, which were demolished to create a new frontage at No. 122. The new building provided more office space, some of which were for rent, and a spacious new courtyard.

By the mid-1960s P&O needed to redevelop the site to provide increased office space. At the same time, the Commercial Union Assurance Company was planning a redevelopment on an adjacent site on the corner of St Mary Axe. Due to a number of issues affecting both sites, notably poor access to the Commercial Union site and the restricted width of the P&O site, it was not possible to obtain planning consents that would optimise the amount of floor space for both companies. Hence they decided on joint development with the reallocation of site boundaries and the creation of an open concourse area at the junction of Leadenhall Street and St Mary Axe. Both companies would have frontages to the new concourse and would retain site areas equivalent to those enclosed by the original boundaries.

Previous building

It was originally designed as a pair with the Commercial Union headquarters (now called St. Helen's) by the architects Gollins Melvin Ward Partnership. The two buildings have a central compressional concrete core and have suspended floors that hang using the steel 'chords' visible on the exterior of the building, which are hung from power trusses at the top of the building (and in the case of No. 1 Undershaft, a further central power-truss). It is an example of a tension structure. At the time, it was considered one of the most complex glass-fronted buildings in the United Kingdom. The architect acknowledged the influence of Mies van der Rohe.

The building was extensively damaged by an IRA bomb in the early-1990s and subsequently had to be recladded. It was occupied by various tenants until November 2006, including the Italian International Bank and Calyon.

In 2007–08, the building was demolished to make way for a new development designed by Richard Rogers. The demolition was undertaken by McGee Group Ltd, with Bovis Lend Lease acting as construction manager. The contract value was £16 million. The first phase of the demolition was conventional: after securing the site, the contractors performed a soft strip of the interior and an asbestos survey prior to demolishing the low-level structures up to podium level. After this, the suspended structure of the building required an unconventional demolition approach that successively dismantled each office floor from the lowest upwards. To achieve this, the contractors installed a structural deck that acted both as a work platform for the demolition work and as a safety barrier. This was jacked upwards as each successive office floor was removed. When all the office floors and upper support trusses had been removed, the concrete core was de-stressed and demolished. Concurrently, the  basement was propped and excavated. The contract took just over two years to complete.

The Leadenhall Building

Designed by Richard Rogers and developed by British Land and Oxford Properties, the new Leadenhall Building is 225 m (737 ft) tall, with 48 floors. With its distinctive wedge-shaped profile it has been nicknamed the Cheesegrater, a name originally given to it by the City of London Corporation's chief planning officer, Peter Rees, who upon seeing a model of the concept "told Richard Rogers I could imagine his wife using it to grate parmesan. [The name] stuck."

The planning application was submitted to the City of London Corporation in February 2004 and was approved in May 2005. In 2006 Scheme Design (RIBA Stage D) started. In a statement made to the London Stock Exchange on 14 August 2008, British Land said it was delaying the project, which was due to start in October 2010. On 22 December 2010, the developer announced the project was moving forward with contracts being signed for the 50/50 joint venture with Oxford Properties.

The new tower features a tapered glass façade on one side which reveals steel bracings, along with a ladder frame to emphasise the vertical appearance of the building. It also appears to anchor the tower to the ground, giving a sense of strength. Unlike other tall buildings, which typically use a concrete core to provide stability, the steel "Megaframe", engineered by Arup, provides stability to the entire structure and is the world's tallest of its kind. The base features a 30m high atrium which is open to the public and extends the adjacent plaza. The flat side of the building is also encased in glass, and houses the mechanical services –  in particular the elevator shafts.  These have been turned into an architectural feature, similar to the neighbouring Lloyd's building – they deliberately display the elevator machinery, with bright orange counterweights and elevator motors.

This unusual design's main drawback is the building's relatively small floorspace (84,424 m2) for a building of its height. It is hoped that the slanting wedge-shaped design will have less impact on the protected sightline of St Paul's Cathedral when viewed from Fleet Street and the west.

In July 2011, British Land and Oxford Properties announced that Laing O'Rourke was the main contractor for the works of the new Leadenhall Building. Throughout 2011, construction began with the basement floors. By December 2012, the steelwork had progressed up to the fifth mega-level, with topping out expected in February or March. The glass cladding had also begun to rise. In May 2013, the co-developers announced that the building was over 51% pre-let. By June 2013, the steelwork of the building was completely topped out with the glass cladding covering almost half the building.

The construction of the building was the subject of an episode of the Super Skyscrapers documentary series by the American television channel PBS in February 2014.

Tenants

The development has succeeded in attracting tenants, especially in contrast to the nearby part-built Pinnacle and completed Heron Tower. In May 2011, it was announced that the lower 10 floors of the Leadenhall Building have been pre-let to insurance broker Aon, which moved its global headquarters to London from Chicago. Insurance group Amlin has also agreed terms on a 20-year lease of the 19th to 24th floors as well as the top floor, the 45th, from March 2015, for a total of 111,000 sq ft of office space.

See also

 City of London landmarks
 Leadenhall Market
 List of tallest buildings and structures in London

References

External links

Information on the 1969 building

Buildings and structures demolished in 2007
Skyscrapers in the City of London
Office buildings completed in 2014
Oxford Properties
2014 establishments in the United Kingdom